The Stieglitz Award was established in 1940 using funds from the memorial legacy of Professor Julius Stieglitz, who worked at the University of Chicago from 1892 to his death in 1937. The lecture was presented alternatively by the University of Chicago Chemistry department and the Chicago Section of the American Chemical Society in consecutive years until 1994. There was a pause in presentation from 1994 until 1999 until the funds built up to a level where they were sufficient to support a stipend of $1000 plus expenses for each year.

Stieglitz Lecturers
Source: ACS Chicago Section

See also

 List of chemistry awards

References

Awards of the American Chemical Society